Secretariat railway station is one of eleven minor railway station on the Western Sabah Railway Line located in Secretariat Building, Kota Kinabalu, Sabah, Malaysia. The station was renovated in 2012 and known as the last station towards the city centre.

References

External links 
 

Railway stations opened in 1914
Railway stations in Sabah